Amazon is an American technology company that has a multinational presence with offices and facilities around the world. The company is based in Seattle, Washington and has over 1,600,000 employees globally, with 950,000 of those in the US.

Headquarters 

Amazon's global headquarters are in more than 40 owned and leased buildings spread across Seattle's adjacent South Lake Union, Denny Triangle, and Downtown neighborhoods. The first 14 buildings Amazon occupied in South Lake Union were developed primarily by Vulcan, Inc. from 2008 onward, the first 11 of which were acquired from Vulcan in 2012 at a cost of $1.16 billion. The company was previously headquartered in rented space within the Pacific Medical Center, located in the city's Beacon Hill neighborhood, from 1998 to 2011.

Amazon is currently building a new four tower, four low-rise, complex in Seattle's Denny Triangle neighborhood to serve as the primary headquarters, though it will retain many of the earlier purchased buildings to house its more than 45,000 corporate employees in the Seattle area. The plan for the new campus, designed by NBBJ and named "Rufus 2.0" after a dog who was part of the company in its early days, was approved by the city of Seattle in 2012 and construction began the year after. The first of the towers, nicknamed Doppler, opened on December 14, 2015.

Other major campuses

The European headquarters are in Luxembourg's capital, Luxembourg City.

On November 13, 2018, Amazon announced that it would divide the planned HQ2 between New York City and Northern Virginia. On February 14, 2019, Amazon canceled its plan for the HQ2 location in New York City. Amazon is also in the process of building a retail hub of operations center in Nashville, Tennessee.

On August 21, 2019, Amazon opened its largest campus in the world at Nanakramguda in Hyderabad, India. It is the first Amazon-owned campus located outside the United States and features the single largest Amazon-owned building in the world. The 9.5 acre campus houses over 15,000 employees.

Amazon plans to build a major campus in Bellevue, Washington, a suburb of Seattle, that will host 15,000 employees by 2025. The company opened its first Bellevue office in 2017, marking a return to the city since the company was founded there in 1995. The Bellevue campus will include the 43-story Bellevue 600 tower, which is planned to be the tallest building in the city and the tallest to be developed by Amazon.

Software development centers 
While much of Amazon's software development occurs in Seattle, the company employs software developers in centers across the globe. Some of these sites are run by an Amazon subsidiary called A2Z Development.

 North America
 United States 
 Atlanta, GA
 Austin, TX 
 Boston, MA
 Cambridge, MA 
Chicago, IL
 Cupertino, CA
 Dallas, TX
 Denver, CO
 Detroit, MI
 Herndon, VA
Houston, TX
 Irvine, CA 
 Miami, FL  
 Minneapolis, MN 
 New York, NY (Manhattan West, Herald Square, Fifth Avenue)
 Phoenix, AZ
 Pittsburgh, PA 
 Portland, OR
 San Diego, CA
 San Francisco, CA
 San Luis Obispo, CA
 Seattle, WA 
 Sunrise, FL 
 Tempe, AZ
 Canada 
 Vancouver, BC
 Toronto, ON
Central America
Costa Rica 
South America
Brazil
São Paulo
Chile
Santiago de Chile
Colombia
Bogotá (BOG15)
Medellín (2023)
 Europe
 Luxembourg
 Luxembourg City
 Austria 
Graz
 Belgium
 Brussels
 Czech Republic
 Prague
 Denmark
 Copenhagen
 Finland
 Helsinki
 Germany
Berlin 
Dresden
Aachen
 Greece
 Athens
 Ireland
Dublin
 Netherlands
Amsterdam
 Poland 
Gdańsk
 Portugal
 Lisbon
 Romania
 Bucharest
 Iași
 Spain 
Madrid
Barcelona
 United Kingdom
Cambridge CB1 
Edinburgh 
London
 Asia
 Japan
 Tokyo
India
Bangalore
Hyderabad
New Delhi
Chennai
 Kuwait
 Kuwait City
 United Arab Emirates
 Dubai
Israel
Tel Aviv
Haifa
 Africa
 South Africa
 Cape Town
 Oceania
 Australia
 Sydney
 Melbourne
 New Zealand
 Auckland
 Wellington

Customer service centers 

 Africa
 Morocco
 Rabat
 South Africa
 Cape Town
 Asia
 Philippines
 Cebu City
 Manila
 Europe
 Ireland
 Cork
 Italy
 Cagliari
 Netherlands
 The Hague
 Spain
 Barcelona
 United Kingdom
 Edinburgh
 Central America
 Costa Rica
 San Jose
 South America
 Colombia
 Bogotá (BOG14)
 North America
 Grand Forks, North Dakota
 Huntington, West Virginia
 Kennewick, Washington
 Winchester, Kentucky (LEX11)

Retail 
Below is a list of Amazon's retail locations, as of September 2021. Most of the stores are located inside of the United States, but Whole Foods also operates stores in Canada and the United Kingdom, while Amazon Go has six locations in London under the Amazon Fresh name.

 Whole Foods Market (527)
 Amazon Books (24)
 Amazon Go (30)
Amazon Go Grocery (1)
 Amazon Fresh (24)
 Amazon 4-Star (31) - a collection of new and trending items from Amazon.com that are rated four stars or higher.
 Amazon Pop-Up (7) - small kiosks which sell Amazon devices such as Echo speakers, Kindle e-readers, Fire tablets, and Fire TV devices, Facebook Portal Plus and Oculus Quest are also found; usually housed in malls. All 87 were closed in May 2019 with 5 initially reopening later on.
 365 by Whole Foods Market (12) - In January 2019, it was announced that the 365 by Whole Foods Market concept would be discontinued and all existing stores would be converted into regular Whole Foods stores.

Pick-up points 
In addition to Amazon Lockers, Amazon has around 30 staffed pick-up points in the United States and over 800 independent ones in India. The US locations have large sets of Amazon Lockers and an area for customers to make returns. The India locations are in existing retailers and have customers wait for a store employee to retrieve their package. The company also operates 33 Treasure Trucks in the United States and United Kingdom, which serve as pick-up points for one deal per day that customers can order using the Amazon app.

Fulfillment and warehousing 
Amazon fulfillment centers are large facilities with hundreds of employees, sometimes thousands. Employees are responsible for five basic tasks: unpacking and inspecting incoming goods; placing goods in storage and recording their location; picking goods from their computer recorded locations to make up an individual shipment; sorting and packing orders; and shipping. A computer that records the location of goods and maps out routes for pickers plays a key role: employees carry hand-held computers which communicate with the central computer and monitor their rate of progress. A picker may walk 10 or more miles a day.

In newer fulfillment centers, items are stored on pods and brought to pickers by robots (Amazon Robotics). In the United Kingdom, initial staffing was provided by Randstad Holding and other temporary employment agencies. In the United States, many workers are hired as Amazon employees and granted shares of stock or sign-on bonuses, while others are offered temporary seasonal positions. "When we have permanent positions available, we look to the top-performing temporary associates to fill them," said an Amazon spokesperson. Amazon acquired Kiva Systems, a warehouse automation company, in 2012.

Amazon fulfillment centers can also provide warehousing and order-fulfillment for third-party sellers, for an extra fee. Third-party sellers can use Fulfillment by Amazon (FBA) to ship for other platforms as well, such as eBay or their own websites.

On March 20, 2020, Amazon agreed to remove metal detectors from its warehouses after a warehouse worker tested positive for COVID-19. In addition to removing metal detectors, Amazon also agreed to enact a "6 feet rule", which will enforce a six-feet distance between warehouse employees.

North America

United States
Fulfillment centers are located in the following cities and are often named after an International Air Transport Association airport code (Fulfillment Center Codes). Sortation centers are regional warehouses where Amazon packages are sorted to a last mile carrier, typically either Amazon Logistics or the United States Postal Service.

This list includes Amazon fulfillment centers and sortation centers but excludes other types of Amazon warehouses such as Amazon Logistics delivery stations, Prime Now warehouses, or Amazon Fresh warehouses.

Alabama
 Bessemer (BHM1)
 Huntsville (opening 2022)
 Madison (HSV1)
 Mobile (MOB1)
 Montgomery (opening 2022)
 Theodore (MOB5)
 Arizona
 Avondale (GYR3)
 Goodyear (PHX5, GYR1)
 Phoenix (PHX3, PHX6, PHX7, PHX8, TUS1, AZA4, AZA5)
 Tolleson (PHXZ)
 Tucson (TUS2)
Arkansas
 Little Rock (LIT1) (opening 2021)
 North Little Rock (LIT2) (opening 2021)
 California
 Bakersfield (BFL1)
 Beaumont (PSP1)
 Eastvale (LGB3)
 Fresno (FAT1)
 Fontana (LAX9)
 Jurupa Valley (ONT1)
 Lockeford (PCA4 opening 2022)
 Manteca (SCK3) 
 Moreno Valley (ONT6, ONT8)
 Newark (OAK5)
 Ontario (opening 2023)
 Oxnard (OXR1)
 Patterson (OAK3)
 Perris (LGB9) 
Redding (AMZ2)
 Redlands (ONT9, LGB4)
 Rialto (SNA4, LGB8, LGB7)
 Riverside (LGB6)
 Sacramento (SMF1, SMF6)
 San Bernardino (ONT2, ONT5, SBD2, SBD3, SNA7, LGB5)
 San Diego (SAN3, SAN5)
 Shafter (BFL2)
 Stockton (SMF3, SCK1, SCK9, SCK4)
 Tracy (OAK4, SJC7, OAK6) (SCK6 opening 2023)
 Turlock (MCE1 opening 2022)
 Vacaville (SMF5)
 Victorville (SBD4 opening 2022)
 Visalia (FAT2)
 Oakley (TCY9)
 Colorado
 Aurora (DEN2, DEN5, DEN7)
 Colorado Springs (COS5, DEN4, DCS3)
 Loveland (opening 2023)
 Thornton (DEN3)
 Connecticut
North Haven (BDL3, BDL7)
 Wallingford (BDL5, DOB2)
 Windsor (BDL2, BDL4, DCY1)
 Cromwell (BDL6)
 Delaware
 Bear (opening 2021) 
 Middletown (PHL7, PHL9)
 New Castle (ILG1)
 Wilmington (MTN1) (opening 2021) 
 Florida
 Auburndale (TPA3)
 Davenport (MCO5)
 Daytona Beach (opening 2023) 
 Deltona (MCO2)
 Doral (Miami) (MIA5, MIA7)
 Fort Myers (LAL4) 
 Homestead (opening 2021) 
 Jacksonville (JAX2, JAX3, JAX5)
 Lakeland (TPA2)
 New Port Richey (opening 2023) 
 Ocala (TPA6) 
 Opa-Locka (MIA1)
 Orlando (MCO1)
 Port St. Lucie (opening 2022) 
 Ruskin (TPA1)
 Tallahassee (opening 2022) 
 Temple Terrace (TPA4) (2021) 
 Jupiter (PBI2 opening 2021)
 Sunrise (opening 2022) 
 Georgia
 Augusta (Appling, Columbia County) (AGS1) (opens 2021)
Braselton (MGE1)
 Buford (Opens 2021) 
 East Point (ATL6)
 Jefferson (MGE3)
Jefferson (MGE5)
 Lithia Springs (ATL8)
 Macon (SAV3)
 Newnan (CSG1)
 Pendergrass (AGS2)
 Pooler (opening 2022) 
 Stone Mountain (ATL2) 
 Union City (ATL7)
Idaho
 Nampa (BOI2)
 Illinois
 Aurora (MDW9)
 Bridgeview, Illinois (DCH9)
 Channahon (ORD2, ORD9) 
 Chicago (DCH1, DIL3, DLN4, DXH5, KORD)
 Cicero (DLN2)
 Crest Hill (MDW5)
 Downers Grove, Illinois (DXH6)
 Edwardsville (DLI4, STL4, STL6, STL7)
 Elgin (DCH5, DCH7) 
 Huntley (opening 2022) 
 Joliet (MDW2, MDW4, 2023)
 Markham (IGQ1) 
 Matteson (ORD5) 
 Monee (MDW7, ORD4)
 Mundelein (DCH4)
 North Pekin (opening 2022)
 Palatine (DLN8) 
 Rockford (KRFD, RFD1) 
 Romeoville (DCH6, MDW6)
 Skokie (DIL7)
 University Park (IGQ2) (2021) 
 Waukegan (MDW8, MKE6 second building opening in late 2021) 
 West Chicago, Illinois (DIL5)
 Wilmington (HMW1)
 Indiana
 Elkhart (opening 2023)  
 Franklin (opening 2022) 
 Ft. Wayne (FWA4 opening 2022)
 Greenfield (MQJ1)
 Greenwood (IND9)
 Indianapolis (IND4, IND8)
 Jeffersonville (SDF8)
 Lanesvilles (opening 2022)  
 Plainfield (IND2, IND5)
 Whitestown (IND1, XUSE)
 Evansville (WIN1)
Iowa
 Bondurant (DSM5, DSM9)
 Council Bluffs (opening 2022) 
 Davenport (opening 2022) 
 Kansas
 Edgerton (MKC4)
Kansas City (MKC6, FOE1) (FOE1 opening in 2021) 
 Lenexa (MCI5)
 Park City (ICT2) (opening 2021)
 Kentucky
 Campbellsville (SDF1)
 Erlanger (LUK5) 
 Hebron (CVG1, CVG2, CVG3, CVG5, CVG7, CVG9, LUK5)
 Lexington (LEX1, LEX2, LEX3, LEX5)
 Louisville (SDF2)
 Shepherdsville (LUK7, SDF4, SDF6, SDF9)
 Louisiana
Baton Rouge (opening 2022) 
Carencro (LFT1) (opening 2021)
Shreveport (opening 2022) 
 Maryland
Baltimore (BWI2, BWI5, MTN5)
 Edgemere (DCA6)
 Hagerstown (HGR2) (opening 2021) 
 North East (MDT2)
 Sparrows Point (DCA1 DCA2)
 White Marsh (MTN9)
 Massachusetts
 Charlton (opening 2023) 
 Everett (BOS6)
 Fall River (BOS7)
 North Andover 2021 
 Stoughton (BOS5)
 Salem (DAS7)
Michigan
 Brownstown Township (DTW5)
 Caledonia (GRR1)
 Delta Township (opening 2022) 
 Detroit (opening 2023) 
 Gaines Township (opening 2022) 
 Hazel Park (DDT1, SMI1 opening 2021) 
 Huron Township (DTW3 opening 2021) 
 Livonia (DET1)
 Plymouth (DTW8)
 Pontiac (DDT6, DET3)
 Romulus (DTW1, DTW3, DTW9, DDT2)
 Shelby Charter Township (DET2)
 Sterling Heights (DGR3)
 Minnesota
 Brooklyn Park (MSP9)
 Lakeville (MSP6 opening 2021) 
 Maple Grove (MSP7) 
 Shakopee (MSP1, MSP5)
 St. Cloud (opening 2021) 
 Woodbury (opening 2022) 
 Mississippi
 Byhalia, Marshall County (MEM2, 2021)
 Horn Lake (PIL1)
 Olive Branch (MEM6) (opening 2021)
 Madison County (JAN1) (opening 2021)
 Missouri
 Hazelwood (STL5)
 Liberty (opening 2022) 
 St. Peters (STL8)
 Republic (STL3 opening 2021)
 Nebraska
 Papillion (OMA2) (opening 2021)
 Nevada
 Henderson (LAS1) 
 North Las Vegas (LAS2, LAS5, LAS6, LAS7, 2021)
 Reno (RNO4)
 New Hampshire
 Nashua (DBO6)
 New Jersey
 Avenel (EWR5, EWR6/7)
 Burlington (ACY2)
 Carney's Point (opening 2021) 
 Carteret (EWR9, DNJ1, CDW5)
 Cranbury (TEB6)
 Edison (LGA5, LGA9)
 Flanders (CDW9)
 Florence (ABE8)
 Logan (TEB3, 2021) 
 Robbinsville (EWR4)
 Somerset (TEB9)
 Swedesboro (ACY5, IVSC, IVSD
 Teterboro (EWR8)
 West Deptford (ACY1)
 New Mexico
 Albuquerque (ABQ1, opening 2021) 
 Los Lunas (opening 2023) 
 New York
 Bronx (Soundview) TBD
 Bronx (Hunts Point) TBD
 Clay (SYR1) (2021) 
 East Fishkill (opening 2022) 
 Lancaster (BUF5)
 Gates (2022) 
 Manhattan (JFK2, JFK7)
 Montgomery (SWF1) (opening 2021) 
 Niagara (opening 2024)
 Schodack (ALB1) 
 Staten Island (JFK8)
 North Carolina
 Charlotte (CLT1, CLT2, CLT4)
 Concord (CLT5)
 Durham (RDU5)
 Fayetteville (opening 2023) 
 Garner (RDU1)
 Graham (RDU9 opening 2021)
 Greensboro (opening 2023) 
 Kannapolis (CLT3)
 Kernersville (GSO1)
 Pineville (CLT6 opening 2021) 
 Smithfield (opening 2022) 
 North Dakota
 Fargo (FAR1)
 Ohio
 Akron (AKC1)
 Canton (opening 2022)
 Etna (CMH1)
 Euclid (CLE3)
 Lockbourne (CMH6)
 Monroe (CMH3)
 New Albany (opening 2022)
 North Randall (CLE2)
 Obetz (CMH2)
 Rossford (PCW1)
 Twinsburg (CLE5)
 Union (DAY1 opening 2022)
 West Jefferson (CMH4)
 Oklahoma
 Oklahoma City (OKC1, OKC2 OKC5, OKC9)
 Tulsa (TUL2) 
 Oregon
 Canby (opening 2023)
 Hillsboro (PDX5)
 Portland (PDX6, EUG5)
 Salem (PDX7)
 Troutdale (PDX9)
 Woodburn (opening 2023)  
 Pennsylvania
 Breinigsville (ABE2, ABE3)
 Carlisle (MDT1, PHL4, PHL6, PHL9, XUSC)
 Easton (ABE4)
 Findlay Township (PIT2) 
 Gouldsboro (AVP2/3)
 Hamburg & Upper Bern Township (RDG1) 
 Hazleton (AVP1)
 Jessup (AVP9 opening 2021) 
 Lewisberry (PHL5)
 Norristown (ABE5)
 Pittsburgh (PIT2, PIT5, PIT9)
 Pittston (AVP6)
 Reading (TEN1)
 Bethel (HDC3)
Rhode Island
Johnston (opening 2023) 
 South Carolina
 Spartanburg (GSP1)
 West Columbia (CAE1, CAE3)
 South Dakota
 Sioux Falls (opening fall 2021) 
 Tennessee
 Alcoa (opening 2022) 
 Charleston (CHA2)
 Chattanooga (CHA1)
 Clarksville (opening 2022) 
 Lebanon (BNA2)
 Memphis (MEM1, MEM4)
 Murfreesboro (BNA3)
 Nashville (BNA5)
 La Vergne  (BNA9)
 Mount Juliet (MQY1) (opening 2021) 
 Texas
 Amarillo (AMA1 opening 2022) 
 Austin (ATX1, ATX2)
 Brookshire (HOU3)
 Coppell (DFW6, FTW2, FTW6)
 Dallas (FTW1, DAL3, FTW8)
 El Paso (ELP1 opening 2021)
 Fort Worth (DFW7, FTW3, FTW4)
 Forney (DDX7)
 Houston (HOU2, HOU6)
 Humble (HOU1)
 Irving (DFW8, DAL2, RBD5)
 Katy (HOU5) 
 Lubbock (opening 2021)
 Missouri City (opening 2021) 
 Pflugerville (AUS2)(opening 2021)
 Richmond (HOU6) (opening 2021) 
 San Antonio (opening 2021 and 2022) 
 San Marcos (SAT2)
 Schertz (SAT1)
 Wilmer (DAL9)
 Waco (AUS3 opening 2021)
 Fort Worth (AFW1)
 Utah
 Salt Lake City (SLC1)
 West Jordan (SLC2) 
 Virginia
 Ashland (RIC5, RIC9)
 Chesapeake (ORF2)
 Chester (RIC2, RIC3)
 Clear Brook (BWI4)
 Fishersville (opening 2023) 
 Petersburg (RIC1)
 Prince George (KRB2)
 Richmond (opening 2022) 
 Stafford County (opening 2022) 
 Suffolk (ORF3) (2021)
 Washington
 Arlington (PAE2)
 Bellevue (SEA8)
 DuPont (BFI3, BFI9)
 Fife (RNT9)
 Kent (BFI4, BFI5, BFI6)
 Lacey (OLM1)
 Pasco (MWH1 and PSC2 opening 2023)
 SeaTac (BFI8)
 Spokane (GEG1)
 Spokane Valley (GEG2)
 Sumner (BFI1, BFI7)
 Wisconsin
 Beloit (JVL1)
 Cottage Grove (opening 2023) 
 Greenville/Appleton (ATW1)
 Kenosha (MKE1, MKE5)
 Oak Creek (MKE2)

Canada
 Alberta
 Calgary (YYC4, YYC6)
 Rocky View County (YYC1, YYC5)
Leduc County (YEG1)
Parkland County (YEG2 opening 2023)
 British Columbia
 Annacis Island (Delta) (YVR2)
 Burnaby (opening 2023)
 Langley (YVR7)
 New Westminster (YVR3)
 Pitt Meadows (opening 2023)
 Richmond (YXX2)
 Tsawwassen (YVR4)
 Ontario
 Toronto (Scarborough) (YYZ9)
 Brampton (YYZ3, YYZ4, YHM5)
 Caledon (Bolton) (YYZ7, YHM9)
 Mississauga (YYZ1)
 Milton (YYZ2)
 Ottawa (Navan) (YOW1)
 Hamilton (YHM1)
 Ajax (YOO1)
 Barrhaven (YOW3 opening mid-2022)
 Southwold (YXU1 opening 2023)
 Whitby (YMH6 opening 2023)
 Québec
 Coteau-du-Lac (YUL9) 
 Longueuil (YUL5)
 Montréal (Lachine) (YUL2)

Mexico
 Baja California
 Tijuana
 Jalisco
 Guadalajara (GDL1) 
 Nuevo León
 Monterrey (MTY1) 
 Sonora
 Hermosillo (HMO1) 
 State of Mexico
 Cuautitlán Izcalli (MEX1, MEX2)
 Tepotzotlán (MEX3)

Europe

Czech Republic
 Prague (2015, PRG2)

 Přerov (2023)

France
 Boigny-sur-Bionne (2000)
 Boves (2017) (BVA1)
 Saran (2007) (ORY1)
 Montélimar (2010) (MRS1)
 Sevrey (2012) (LYS1)
 Lauwin-Planque (2013) (LIL1)
 Brétigny-sur-Orge (2019) (ORY4)
 Augny (2021) (ETZ2)

Germany
 Bavaria
 Graben (2011) (MUC3)
 Eggolsheim (2019) (NUE9)
 Hof (2022) (NUE1)
 Baden-Württemberg
 Pforzheim (2012) (STR1)
Berlin
 Berlin-Mariendorf (2018) (DBE2)
 Brandenburg
 Brieselang (2013) (BER3)
 Schönefeld (2020) (BER8)
 Hessen
 Bad Hersfeld (1996 and 2010) (FRA1, FRA3)
 Gernsheim (2018) (FRAX)
 Lower Saxony
 Achim (2021) (BRE4)
 Winsen (Luhe) (2017) (HAM2)
 Garbsen (2018) (HAJ8)
 Helmstedt (2022) (HAJ1) 
 North Rhine-Westphalia
 Werne (2010 and 2017 ) (EDE5, DTM1)
 Rheinberg (2011) (DUS2)
 Dortmund (2017 and 2018) (DTM2, DTM3)
 Krefeld (2017) (DTM8)
 Dormagen (2018) (CGN9)
 Mönchengladbach (2019) (DUS4)
 Oelde (2020) (PAD1)
 Witten (2020) (DTM9)
 Rhineland-Palatinate
 Koblenz (2012) (CGN1)
 Frankenthal (2018) (FRA7)
 Kaiserslautern (2022) (SCN2)
 Saxony
 Leipzig (2006) (LEJ1)
Leipzig/Halle (2020) (EDDP) Amazon Air
 Saxony-Anhalt
 Sülzetal (2020) (LEJ3)
 Thuringia
 Gera (2021) (LEJ5)

Ireland
 Dublin (2022) (SNN4)

Italy
 Castel San Giovanni (2011 and 2013) (Emilia-Romagna) (MXP5)
 Avigliana (2016) (Piedmont)
 Torrazza Piemonte (2019) (Piedmont) (TRN1)
 Passo Corese (2017) (Lazio) (FCO1)
 Vercelli (2017) (Piedmont) (MXP3)
 Milan (2017) (Lombardy)
 Origgio (2017) (Lombardy)
 Casirate d'Adda (2018) (Lombardy) (LIN8)
 Parma (2020) (Emilia-Romagna)
 San Bellino/Castelguglielmo (2020) (Veneto) (BLQ1)
 Colleferro (2020)) (Lazio) (FCO2)
 Cividate al Piano (2021) (Lombardy) (BGY1)
 Novara (2021) (Lombardy) (MXP6)
 Spilamberto (2021) (Emilia-Romagna) (BLQ8)
 Bitonto (2020) (Apulia)
 Ardea (2022) (Lazio) (FCO5)

Poland
 Poznan (2014) (POZ1)
 Wroclaw (2014 and 2015) (WRO1, WRO2, WRO3, WRO4, WRO5)
 Szczecin - Kołbaskowo (2017) (SZZ1)
 Katowice - Sosnowiec (2017) (KTW1)
 Gliwice 2020 (KTW3)
 Pawlikowice (2019) (LCJ2)
 Lodz (2020 and 2021) (LCJ3, LCJ4)
 Swiebodzin (2021) (POZ2)

Slovakia
 Bratislava (2011)
 Sered (2017) (BTS2)

Spain
 San Fernando de Henares (Madrid) (MAD4)
 Getafe (Madrid) (MAD8)
 Illescas (Toledo, Castilla-La Mancha) (MAD6) 
 El Prat (Barcelona, Catalonia) (BCN1)
 Martorelles (Barcelona, Catalonia) (BCN2)
 Castellbisbal (Barcelona, Catalonia) (BCN3)
 Barberà del Vallès (Barcelona, Catalonia) (BCN8)
 Bobes (Siero, Asturias)
 Dos Hermanas (Andalusia) (SVQ1)
 Alcalá de Henares (MAD9)
 Corvera (Murcia, Regíon de Murcia) (RMU1)

Turkey
 Istanbul (2022) 
 Kocaeli (3PL XTRA)
 Kocaeli (CEVA LOGİSTİCS)
 Ankara

United Kingdom
England
 Milton Keynes (ALT1)
 Rugeley (BHX1)
 Coalville (BHX2)
 Daventry (BHX3, BHX10)
 Coventry (BHX4)
 Rugby (BHX5)
 Hinckley (BHX7)
 Redditch (BHX8)
 Bristol (BRS1, SBS2, DBS2)
 Stoke-on-Trent (CST9, DST1)
 Bexley (DBR1)
 Orpington (DBR2)
 Croydon (DCR2, DCR3)
 Exeter (DEX2)
 Sunderland (DNE1)
 Kegworth (DNG2, EMA1)
 Northampton (DNN1)
 Norwich (DNR1)
 Aylesford (DME1)
 Droitwich (DWR1)
 Wednesbury (DXB1)
 Plymouth (DXP1)
 Sheffield (DXS1)
 Banbury (DOX2)
 Carlisle (DPN1)
 Mansfield (EMA2)
 Eastwood (EMA3)
 Peterborough (EUKA, EUKB, EUK1, EUK5, DPE1)
 Doncaster (LBA1, LBA2, LBA3, LBA4, DDN1)
 Leeds (LBA8, DLS2)
 Tilbury (LCY2)
 Rochester, Kent (LCY8)
 Ridgmont, Milton Keynes (LTN1)
 Hemel Hempstead (LTN2)
 Dunstable (LTN4)
 Bedford (LTN7)
 Manchester (MAN1)
 Warrington (MAN2)
 Bolton (MAN3)
 Chesterfield (MAN4)
 Haydock (MAN8)
 Darlington (MME1)
 Bowburn (MME2)
 Gateshead (NCL1)
 Milton Keynes (STN8)
 Bardon Hill (SNG1, DNG1)
 Rugby (SNG9)
 Swindon (BRS2)
 Dartford (LCY3)
 Rugby (XUKN)
 Lutterworth (DB17, XBH5)
 Wakefield (DSA6, DSA7)
 North Ferriby (opening 2023)
 Wynyard, County Durham (NCL2) (opening 2023)
 Cambridge
 Poole
 Scotland
 Dunfermline (EDI4)
 Gourock (GLA1)
 Edinburgh (SEH1, DEH1)
 Wales
 Crymlyn Burrows (CWL1, DSA1)

Asia

China
 Beijing
 Chengdu
 Guangzhou
 Harbin
 Jinan
 Nanning
 Shanghai
 Shenyang
 Suzhou
 Tianjin
 Xi'an
 Xiamen

Japan
 Chiba Prefecture
 Ichikawa (NRT1)
 Inzai (TPF6)
 Yachiyo (NRT2)
 Gifu Prefecture
 Tajimi(NGO2)
 Kanagawa Prefecture
 Kawasaki (HND9)
 Odawara(FSZ1)
 Kyoto Prefecture
 Kyotanabe
 Okayama Prefecture
 Okayama
 Osaka Prefecture
 Daito (KIX2)
 Fujiidera (KIX4)
 Ibaraki (KIX3)
 Sakai (KIX1)
 Takatsuki (TPF3)
 Saga Prefecture
 Tosu (HSG1)
 Saitama Prefecture
 Kawagoe (NRT5)
 Kawaguchi
 Kawajima (HND3)
 Tokyo Metropolis
 Hachioji(HND8)

India
Amazon operates 60 fulfilment centres across 15 states in India.
 Andhra Pradesh
 Vijayawada (SVGA) 
 Assam
 Guwahati (SGAA)
 Delhi NCT (SDED, SDEE, PNQ2, SDEJ)
 Gujarat
 Ahmedabad (AMD1, AMD2)
 Haryana
 Gurgaon (DEL2, DEL4, DEL5)
 Karnataka
 Bangalore (BLR5, BLR7)
 Madhya Pradesh
 Indore (SIDA)
 Maharashtra
 Bhiwandi (BOM7, BOM5)
 Mumbai (BOM1, BOM3, BOM4)
 Nagpur (NAG1)
 Pune (SPNA)
 Punjab
 Ludhiana (SATA)
 Rajasthan
 Jaipur (SJAB)
 Karauli (NARE)
 Tamil Nadu
 Chennai (MAA4, MAA5)
 Coimbatore (SCJA)
 Telangana
 Hyderabad (HYD1, HYD8, HYD13)
 Uttar Pradesh
 Lucknow (SLKA)
 West Bengal
 Kolkata (SCCA, SCCG, SCCH, SCCF, SCCC, CCU1)

Pakistan
 Multan (2021)

Saudi Arabia
 Jeddah
 Riyadh

Singapore
 Jurong (2017)

United Arab Emirates
 Abu Dhabi (2024) 
 Dubai  (DBX2, DBX3)

Oceania

Australia
 New South Wales
 Kemps Creek (2021) (BWU2) 
 Moorebank (2018) (BWU1)
 Moorebank (2019) (XAU2)
 Mayfield West (2021) (XNC1)
 Queensland
 Brisbane (2020) (BNE1)
 Victoria
 Craigieburn (opening 2022) 
 Dandenong South (2017) (MEL1) 
 Dandenong South (2018) (XAU1)
 Ravenhall (2021) (MEL5) 
 Western Australia
 Perth (2019) (PER2)

South America

Brazil

 Ceará 
 Maracanaú (opening 2021)
 Distrito Federal
 Santa Maria (2021)
 Minas Gerais
Betim (2021)
 Pernambuco
 Cabo de Santo Agostinho (2019)
 Cabo de Santo Agostinho (2021)
Rio de Janeiro
São João de Meriti (GIG1) (2021)
Rio Grande do Sul 
Nova Santa Rita (2021)
 São Paulo
Cajamar (GRU6) (2019)
Cajamar (2020)
Cajamar (2021) (FBA)
Cajamar
Cajamar

Africa

Egypt
10th of Ramadan

Other 
 Audible (service) (subsidiary) headquarters at 1 Washington Park in Newark, New Jersey
 Climate Pledge Arena in Seattle
 Ring Inc. in Santa Monica, California
 Woot headquarters in Carrollton, Texas
 Zappos headquarters in Las Vegas

Closed fulfillment, warehousing and customer service locations 
Czechia
Prague Fulfillment Center (2013-2018, PRG1)
Netherlands
 The Hague Customer Service Center (2000 to February 2001)
UK
 Edinburgh (EDI1)
 United States
 Seattle, Washington SDC Seattle Distribution Center (Georgetown) – 2001
 Carteret, New Jersey (LGA7 LGA8) 
 Chambersburg, Pennsylvania – 2009
 Eastvale, California (SNA6 and SNA9)
 Fernley, Nevada (RNO1)
 McDonough, Georgia – 2001
 Munster, Indiana – 2009
 Phoenix, Arizona (PHX1) 
 Red Rock, Nevada – 2009
 Tolleson, Arizona (PHX9)

Notes

References